Birmingham Contemporary Music Group (BCMG) is a British chamber ensemble based in Birmingham, England specialising in the performance of new and contemporary music.  BCMG performs regularly at the CBSO Centre and Symphony Hall in Birmingham, tours nationally and worldwide and has appeared several times at the Proms in London.

Musicians from the City of Birmingham Symphony Orchestra formed the ensemble in 1987, with Simon Rattle as its founding patron.  Since then BCMG has premiered over 150 new works and won numerous awards, including the 2004 Royal Philharmonic Society Audience Development Award, the 1995 Gramophone Award for Best Orchestral Recording, the 1993 Royal Philharmonic Society Chamber Ensemble Award, the 1993 Prudential Award for Music, and The Arts Ball 2002 Outstanding Achievement Award.

Thomas Adès was the first music director of BCMG, from 1998 to 2000.  The current artistic director of BCMG is Stephan Meier, who succeeded Stephen Newbould (artistic director 2001-2016). John Woolrich and Oliver Knussen were artists-in-association with BCMG.

Past chairs of BCMG have included Stephen Saltaire, who served in the post from 2000 to 2015.  In December 2015, BCMG announced the appointment of Christoph Trestler as its new chair.

Sound Investment

The Sound Investment scheme is a partnership between BCMG, the composers whom it commissions to write new pieces and BCMG's audience. Members of the public are invited to "invest" in a new commission by paying a sum of money, currently £150, to purchase Sound Investment Units in the new work and so contribute to the costs involved in commissioning new pieces. For each commissioned piece, a certain number of Units are available, typically 30-50. Sound Investors are kept informed about "their" work's progress and are invited to attend rehearsals, as well as the first public performance. They are also able to purchase either a signed copy of the score or receive a signed copy of the score's title page. Composer Colin Matthews, who has had four works commissioned by BCMG, has called the Sound Investors "a remarkable group...although the only return on their investment is a signed copy of the score.

Composers and works commissioned

(The year shown is the year of first performance)

1990: Simon Holt: "Lilith"

1992: Geoffrey Poole: The Magnification of the Virgin

1992: David Lang: My Evil Twin

1993: Elena Firsova: Distance

1993: David Sawer: The Memory of Water

1994: Detlev Muller-Siemens: Phoenix

1994: Errollyn Wallen: Are you worried...?

1994: Colin Matthews: ...through the glass

1995: Philip Cashian: Chamber Concerto

1995: Aaron Jay Kernis: Goblin Market

1995: Judith Weir: Musicians Wrestle Everywhere

1996: Sally Beamish: A Book of Seasons

1996: Osvaldo Golijov: Last Round

1996: Howard Skempton: Delicate

1997: Thomas Adès: Concerto Conciso

1997: Peter-Paul Nash: Symphony No. 2

1997: Gerard McBurney: Desire

1998: Simon Bainbridge: Guitar Concerto

1998: David Lang: The Passing Measures

1999: Alastair Greig: Play

1999: Bent Sørensen: Sinful Songs

1999: Stuart MacRae: Portrait

1999: Kenneth Hesketh: The Circling Canopy of Night

2000: Gerald Barry: Wiener Blut

2000: Colin Matthews: Continuum

2000: Thea Musgrave: Lamenting with Ariadne

2000: John Woolrich: Bitter Fruit

2001: Poul Ruders: ABYSM

2001: Edward Rushton: Palace

2002: Gerald Barry: Dead March

2002: Marc-André Dalbavie: Palimpseste

2002: Mark-Anthony Turnage: The Torn Fields

2002: Simon Holt: Boots of Lead

2003: Param Vir: The Theatre of Magical Beings

2004: Philip Cashian: Three Pieces

2004: Michael Wolters: Neighbours for a Night

2005: Julian Anderson: Book of Hours

2005: Huw Watkins: Rondo

2005: Judith Weir: Psyche and Manimekelai

2005: Howard Skempton: Ben Somewhen

2006: Philip Cashian: Skein

2006: Morgan Hayes: Violin Concerto

2006: Dave Douglas: Blue Latitudes

2007: John Woolrich: Going a Journey

2007: Tansy Davies: Falling Angel

2007: Elvind Buene: Garland (for Matthew Locke)

2007: Brett Dean: Wolf-Lieder

2007: Johannes Maria Staud: One Movement and Five Miniatures

2007: Nicholas Sackman: Concerto in Black

2008: Gerald Barry: Beethoven

2008: Luke Bedford: Good Dream She Has

2008: Kevin Volans: The Partenheimer Project

2009: Francesco Antonioni: Ballata

2009: Helen Grime:  A Cold Spring

2009: Simon Holt: Capriccio Spettrale

2009: Richard Causton: Chamber Symphony

2009: Vic Hoyland: Hey Presto!... moon - flower - bat

2009: David Sawer: Rumpelstiltskin

2010: Charlie Usher: Slow Pan

2010: Michael Wolters: I see with my eyes closed

2011: Jo Kondo: Three Songs Tennyson Sung

2011: Dominic Muldowney: Six Cabaret Songs

2011: Silvina Milstein: de oro y sombra ... 

2012: Tansy Davies: Nature

2012: Alexander Goehr: To These Dark Steps / The Fathers are Watching

2012: John Woolrich: The Mustering Drum

2013: Richard Baker: The Tyranny of Fun

2013: David Sawer: Rumpelstiltskin Suite

2013: David Sawer: The Lighthouse Keepers

2014: David Lang: Crowd Out

2014: Param Vir: Raga Fields

2015: Ivo Nilsson: Rapidità

2015: Gerald Barry: The Importance of Being Earnest

2015: Melinda Maxwell: FRACTURES: Monk Unpacked

2016: Edmund Finnis: Parallel Colour

2016: Michael Zev Gordon: Seize the Day

2016: Benedict Mason: Horns Strings and Harmony

2016: Richard Baker: Hwyl fawr ffrindiau

2016: John Woolrich: Swansong

2016: Luke Bedford: In Black Bright Ink

2016: Zoë Martlew: Broad St. Burlesque

References

External links
Birmingham Contemporary Music Group official website
BCMG Past Commissions

Musical groups established in 1987
English orchestras
Classical music in the United Kingdom
Culture in Birmingham, West Midlands